Laurent Sky is a French pornographic film director.

Awards
2004 AVN Award winner – Best Director (Non Feature) - Fetish: The Dream Scape
2006 AVN Award nominee – Best Director (Non-Feature) - Raw Desire
2007 AVN Award nominee – Best Director (Non-Feature) - Porno Revolution
2007 AVN Award nominee – Director of the Year (Body of Work)

References

French pornographic film directors
Living people
Year of birth missing (living people)